Sicut cervus is a motet for four voices by Giovanni Pierluigi da Palestrina. It sets the beginning of Psalm 42, Psalmus XLII in the Latin version of the Psalterium Romanum rather than the Vulgate Bible. The incipit is "Sicut cervus desiderat ad fontes" (As the deer desires the fountains) followed by a second part (secunda pars) "Sitivit anima mea" (My soul thirsts). It was published in 1604 in Motecta festorum, Liber 2, and has become one of Palestrina's most popular motets, regarded as a model of Renaissance polyphony, expressing spiritual yearning.

History 
The motet is a setting of Psalm 42:1-3. The Psalm was a prescribed tract for the blessing of the water (font) on Holy Saturday, recalling the water of baptism as well as the "living water of the eucharist". The text, speaking of the longing for God, retained its association with funeral music, having been widely used as the Tract before the Tridentine Roman Missal of 1570 standardized the tract Absolve, Domine.

Palestrina's setting was posthumously published in Venice in 1604 in the collection Motectorum quatuor vocibus, ... liber secundus, a sequel to the 1564 Motecta festorum. It is now one of Palestrina's most anthologized works and regarded as a model of Renaissance polyphony.

Music 
The motet is written for four voices, soprano, alto, tenor, and bass. It is set in imitative polyphony throughout, with attention to the meaning of the text in subtle word-painting. For the word "desiderat", expressing longing, the pace is faster, and the melody rises, reaching its peak on the word "fontes" (streams, water, fountains). In the continuation of the first part, "ita desiderat anima mea ad te, Deus" (Thus longs my soul for Thee, God), the human desire expressed in the first person is rendered in denser imitation and with more intense dissonance. The motet has been described as the expression of "serene but fervent spiritual yearning".

References

External links 
 
 

1570 works
Palestrina
Compositions by Giovanni Pierluigi da Palestrina
Psalm settings